The Hinako Islands are a group of small islands off the west coast of Nias Island in the Sirombu District of the West Nias Regency, part of the North Sumatra Province of Indonesia.

The islands are a popular surfing destination, specifically Bawa Island, and nearby Asu Island. The waves at Bawa favor a northwest wind and the waves at Asu favor a southeast wind. The two islands are approximately 45 minutes apart by speedboat.

The waves at Bawa were revealed in magazine articles and a surf film in 1994, featuring surfers Tom Curren (USA) and Francis Desmond "Frankie" Oberholzer (RSA) riding some of the biggest waves ever seen in Indonesia at that time photographed by Ted Grambeau (AUS) and filmed by Sonny Miller (USA).

The breaking pattern of the waves at both Bawa and Asu was significantly affected by the nearby earthquake of 28 March 2005, measuring 8.6 on the Richter scale. The seafloor in the region was raised by up to two meters and over 900 people were killed on Nias Island.

The Hinako Islands have long been infamous for malaria, and have few accommodations for visitors.

References

External links
 Map including the Hinako Islands

Notes

Archipelagoes of Indonesia
Populated places in Indonesia